NewsChannel 5 may refer to -

 KGWN-TV, Cheyenne, Wyoming
 KRGV-TV, Weslaco, Texas
 KSDK-TV, St. Louis, Missouri
 WDTV-TV, Bridgeport, West Virginia
 WEWS-TV, Cleveland, Ohio
 WPTV-TV, West Palm Beach, Florida
 WPTZ-TV, Plattsburgh, New York
 WTVF-TV, Nashville, Tennessee